The Achensee Railway is a  long metre gauge railway running between Jenbach and Seespitz on Lake Achen in Tyrol (Austria). It is Europe's oldest cog railway which is still steam operated.

History

In 1886, Theodor Friedrich Freiherr von Dreifuss proposed to connect Jenbach to the Achensee. Despite concerns by villagers in the area, the proposal was supported by the monastery at Fiecht, which owned the Achensee and ran steam boats on the lake.

Consent to build the line was given on 1 August 1888 by Emperor Franz Josef. The line was constructed by the Soenderop Company of Berlin. The official opening of the line was on 8 June 1889. The line originally ended a short distance short of the pier for the steamboats as it was intended to run a luggage service between Seespitz station and the pier at an extra charge. The railway was extended to a new station serving the steamboats in 1916.

The railway carried its highest numbers of passengers during World War II  and after the war the railway was an important method of supplying the region with goods and materials. In 1950, the Tirolean Water Company (TIWAG) acquired a majority of the shares in the railway, passing them to the villages of Achenkirch, Maurach and Eben in 1979. Carriage of freight ceased in 1973. The railway was remodelled with support from TIWAG, the Federal Government and State Government.

On 16 May 2008, the engine shed at Jenbach railway station was destroyed in a fire. Locomotive No. 1 was damaged, but will be restored, as will the engine shed. In 2009, the shed has been completed and the No. 1 was rebuilt.

On 25 March 2020, the railway company went bankrupt. Action is underway to salvage the railway.

From 2022, the Achenseebahn Infrastruktur- und Betriebs- GmbH , founded on March 2, 2021 as the successor company, is to be in charge of operations.  In May 2021, the new operating company was granted the license.  Management and operations management is taken over by the Zillertalbahn.  An operation resumption is scheduled for May 2022.

Rolling stock

Steam locomotives

All steam locomotives are 0-4-0RT engines.

Passenger stock

The Achensee Railway has four open and two closed four-wheeled coaches. The open coaches were built in Graz in 1889. The closed coaches were built in Esslingen in 1903 and 1907.

Freight stock

The Achenseebahn had four lowside open wagons, one highside open wagon and one van on opening. Three more lowsides were acquired new in 1926. These three vehicles were in service until 1973; the others were withdrawn in 1955.

Infrastructure
It runs between Jenbach and Achensee Schiffstation. The Riggenbach rack system is installed between Jenbach and Eben, from which point the line descends gently to Achensee Schiffstation. Upwards trains propel to Eben, where the engine runs round and hauls the coaches to the Achensee terminal. The engine leads throughout on the downward journey.

References

External links

Homepage of the Achensee Railway

Metre gauge railways in Austria
Railway lines opened in 1889
Rack railways in Austria